Kenneth Chan Ka-lok, born 12 June 1968) was, from 2012 until 2016, an elected member of the Hong Kong Legislative Council, representing the Hong Kong Island geographical constituency. He was the chairman of the Hong Kong Civic Party. He is an Associate Professor in political science at Hong Kong Baptist University. His research interests include the political economy of the European Union and comparative politics of post-communist Central Europe.

Chan married his wife Gabi in 1995.  Gabi is Polish.  They have four daughters and one son.

Chan also is a Roman Catholic.

Academic record
 Bachelor of Social Science (Government and Public Administration) with Honours at the Chinese University of Hong Kong, 1990
 Master of Philosophy in Politics at St Peter's College, Oxford, 1992
 Doctor of Philosophy in Politics at Nuffield College, Oxford, 1998

References

External links
HKBU Staff Page

Leaders of political parties
Living people
Civic Party politicians
1968 births
Hong Kong Roman Catholics
HK LegCo Members 2012–2016
Alumni of the Chinese University of Hong Kong
Alumni of St Peter's College, Oxford
Alumni of Nuffield College, Oxford
Academic staff of Hong Kong Baptist University
Members of the Election Committee of Hong Kong, 2007–2012
Members of the Election Committee of Hong Kong, 2012–2017